
Year 69 BC was a year of the pre-Julian Roman calendar. At the time it was known as the Year of the Consulship of Hortensius and Metellus (or, less frequently, year 685 Ab urbe condita). The denomination 69 BC for this year has been used since the early medieval period, when the Anno Domini calendar era became the prevalent method in Europe for naming years.

Events 
 By place 

 Roman Republic 
 October 6 – Roman Republic troops under Lucius Lucullus defeat the army of Tigranes II of Armenia in the Battle of Tigranocerta, and capture Tigranocerta, capital of Armenia.
 Consuls: Quintus Caecilius Metellus Creticus and Quintus Hortensius.
 Antiochus XIII Asiaticus is installed as king of Syria.
 Parthians and Romans re-establish Euphrates as a frontier.
 Gaius Julius Caesar is a quaestor in Spain.

 Egypt 
 Ptolemy XII deposes Cleopatra V, and becomes sole ruler.

 Greece 
 Kydonia, an ancient city on the island of Crete falls to Roman military forces.
 Rhodes becomes a bulwark against pirates, the Rhodians are unable to suppress piracy in the Aegean Sea. Delos gets the status of a free port.

Births 
 Cleopatra VII Philopator, queen of Egypt (d. 30 BC)
 Hyeokgeose, Korean king and founder of Silla (d. AD 4)
 Wang Zhengjun, empress of the Western Han Dynasty (d. AD 13)

Deaths 
 Cleopatra II Selene, queen of Egypt
 Julia, wife of Gaius Marius (b. c. 130 BC)

References